In enzymology, a biotin—CoA ligase is an enzyme that catalyzes the chemical reaction

ATP + biotin + CoA  AMP + diphosphate + biotinyl-CoA

The 3 substrates of this enzyme are ATP, biotin, and CoA, whereas its 3 products are AMP, diphosphate, and biotinyl-CoA.

This enzyme belongs to the family of ligases, specifically those forming carbon-sulfur bonds as acid-thiol ligases.  The systematic name of this enzyme class is biotin:CoA ligase (AMP-forming). Other names in common use include biotinyl-CoA synthetase, biotin CoA synthetase, and biotinyl coenzyme A synthetase.  This enzyme participates in biotin metabolism.

References

 

EC 6.2.1
Enzymes of unknown structure